Joselyne Edwards Laboriel (born September 29, 1995) is a Panamanian mixed martial artist who competes in the Bantamweight division of the Ultimate Fighting Championship.

Background
Edwards started boxing when she was 13 years old, and after four years of boxing, she started doing MMA when she was 17. She had seen the UFC on TV in her home of Panama City, but she did not know a gym that taught it. She then started doing jiu-jitsu and after six months debuted in MMA.

Mixed martial arts career

Early career
Edwards compiled a 9–2 record on the regional scene, winning the UCC Women's Bantamweight Championship in her homeland of Panama and defending it twice. In 2018, she moved to her camp to America where she defeated former Bellator fighter Jessica Middleton via TKO on May 18, 2018, at The Fight Series. She would then defeat highly touted prospect Brenda Gonzales at KOTC: Aggressive Lifestyle on September 1, 2018, via armbar, in the process winning the KOTC Bantamweight Championship. Afterwards, she competed against fellow future UFC fighter Sarah Alpar for the LFA Women's Bantamweight Championship at LFA 55, losing the close bout via split decision.

Ultimate Fighting Championship
Edwards, as a replacement for Bethe Correia, faced Wu Yanan on January 16, 2021, at UFC on ABC: Holloway vs. Kattar. She won the bout via unanimous decision.

Edwards, as a replacement for Nicco Montaño, faced Karol Rosa on February 6, 2021, at UFC Fight Night: Overeem vs. Volkov. Edwards lost the fight via unanimous decision.

Edwards was scheduled to face Zarah Fairn Dos Santos on August 28, 2021, at UFC on ESPN: Barboza vs. Chikadze. However, the contest was cancelled in late July as Edwards was removed from the event in favor of another bout.

Edwards faced Jessica-Rose Clark at UFC Fight Night: Costa vs. Vettori on October 23, 2021. She lost the fight via unanimous decision.

Edwards faced Ramona Pascual on June 11, 2022, at UFC 275. She won the fight via unanimous decision. 11 out of 16 media outlets scored the bout as a win for Pascual.

In a quick turnaround, Edwards replaced an injured Mariya Agapova to face Ji Yeon Kim at UFC 277 on July 9, 2022. At the weigh-ins, Edwards weighed in at 137.5 pounds, one and a half pounds over the bantamweight non-title fight limit and was fined 20% of her purse, which went to her opponent Kim. She won the fight via split decision.

Edwards is scheduled to face Lucie Pudilová on April 15, 2023 at UFC on ESPN 44.

Championships and accomplishments 

 King of the Cage
 KOTC Bantamweight Championship (One time)
 Ultimate Combat Challenge
 UCC Women's Bantamweight Championship (One time)
 Two successful title defenses

Mixed martial arts record

|-
|Win
|align=center| 12–4
|Ji Yeon Kim
|Decision (split)
|UFC 277
|
|align=center|3
|align=center|5:00
|Dallas, Texas, United States
|
|-
|Win
|align=center| 11–4
|Ramona Pascual
|Decision (unanimous)
|UFC 275
|
|align=center|3
|align=center|5:00
|Kallang, Singapore
|
|-
|Loss
|align=center| 10–4
|Jessica-Rose Clark
|Decision (unanimous)
|UFC Fight Night: Costa vs. Vettori
|
|align=center|3
|align=center|5:00
|Las Vegas, Nevada, United States
|
|-
| Loss
| align=center| 10–3
| Karol Rosa
| Decision (unanimous)
| UFC Fight Night: Overeem vs. Volkov
| 
| align=center|3
| align=center|5:00 
| Las Vegas, Nevada, United States
| 
|-
| Win
| align=center| 10–2
| Wu Yanan
|Decision (unanimous)
|UFC on ABC: Holloway vs. Kattar 
|
|align=center|3
|align=center|5:00
|Abu Dhabi, United Arab Emirates
| 
|-
| Win
| align=center| 9–2
| Pamela Gonzalez
|KO (punches and body kick)
| UWC 22: Total War
| 
| align=center| 1
| align=center| 0:28
| Tijuana, Mexico
|
|-
| Loss
| align=center| 8–2
| Sarah Alpar
| Decision (split)
| LFA 55
|
|align=center|5
|align=center|5:00
|Dallas, Texas, United States
|
|-
| Win
| align=center| 8–1
| Brenda Gonzales
|Submission (armbar)
|KOTC: Aggressive Lifestyle
|
|align=center|2
|align=center|2:53
|Ignacio, Colorado, United States
| 
|-
| Win
| align=center| 7–1
| Jessica Middleton
| TKO (punches)
| The Fight Series
| 
| align=center| 1
| align=center| 0:57
| West Des Moines, Iowa, United States
| 
|-
| Win
| align=center| 6–1
| Trisha Cicero
|Decision (unanimous)
| UCC Fantastic Fight Night 8
| 
| align=center| 3
| align=center| 5:00
| Panama City, Panama
|
|-
| Win
| align=center|5–1
|Francelys Rivero
|TKO (punches)
|UCC Fantastic Fight Night 5
|
|align=center|1
|align=center|3:30
|Panama City, Panama
|
|-
| Win
| align=center|4–1
|Mauris Marcano Gonzales
|Submission (armbar)
|Ultimate Combat Challenge 31
|
|align=center|1
|align=center|2:28
|Panama City, Panama
|
|-
| Win
| align=center| 3–1
| Yacqueline Arosemena
|Submission (verbal)
|Ultimate Combat Challenge 29
|
|align=center|1
|align=center|1:58
|Panama City, Panama
|
|-
| Win
| align=center|2–1
| Heydi Irias
|TKO (punches)
| Ultimate Combat Challenge 28
|
| align=center|2
| align=center|3:45
|El Progreso, Honduras
|
|-
| Loss
| align=center| 1–1
| Mauris Marcano Gonzales
| Submission (armbar)
|Ultimate Combat Challenge 25
|
| align=center|2
| align=center|1:54
|Panama City, Panama
|
|-
| Win
| align=center|1–0
| Evelyn Jessenia Caballero Llanes
| KO (punch)
|Ultimate Combat Challenge 24
|
|align=center|1
|align=center|0:10
|Panama City, Panama
|

See also 
 List of current UFC fighters
 List of female mixed martial artists

References

External links 
  
 

1995 births
Living people
Panamanian female mixed martial artists
Bantamweight mixed martial artists
Mixed martial artists utilizing Brazilian jiu-jitsu
Ultimate Fighting Championship female fighters
Panamanian practitioners of Brazilian jiu-jitsu
Female Brazilian jiu-jitsu practitioners